Mervyn Napier Waller CMG  OBE  (19 June 189330 March 1972) was a noted Australian muralist, mosaicist and painter in stained glass and other media.  He is perhaps best known for the mosaics and stained glass for the Hall of Memory at the Australian War Memorial, Canberra, completed in 1958.  However, Melbourne has been described as "a gallery of Napier Waller’s work", as eleven monumental murals by Waller are on display in the central business district and at the University of Melbourne’s main campus.

The Australian Dictionary of Biography says his work "was strongly influenced by Pre-Raphaelite and late-nineteenth century British painters; his monumental works show an increasingly classical and calmly formal style, using timeless and heroic figure compositions to express ideas and ideals, sometimes with theosophical or gnostic overtones".

Biography
Napier Waller was born in Penshurst, Victoria in 1893.  His parents were native-born: William Waller, a contractor, and Sarah née Napier.  He studied at the National Gallery schools in Melbourne, and exhibited paintings and drawings in 1915.  He enlisted in the Australian Imperial Force that year, and soon after married Christian Yandell, a fellow art student.

He served in France from 1916, being so seriously wounded at Bullecourt that he lost his right arm. He was right-handed but learned to use his left hand while recuperating.  Back in Australia, he established his reputation by exhibiting more paintings.  In 1923 he exhibited a series of linocuts, being the first to make and exhibit linocuts in Australia.  His first mural design failed to win a competition in 1921.  His first major mural was for the Menzies Hotel in Melbourne, in 1927.  In 1927 he completed murals at the Melbourne Town Hall.  The State Library of Victoria accepted his mural Peace After Victory in 1928.  He studied mosaics in Ravenna and Venice in 1929.

On his return, he worked almost exclusively in mosaic and stained glass.  His major pieces during the 1930s were a monumental mosaic for the University of Western Australia, and mosaics and murals for Newspaper House (1933) and the dining hall in the Myer Emporium (1935).  He became senior art teacher in the Applied Art School of the Working Men's College, Melbourne (now the Royal Melbourne Institute of Technology). His students there included Loudon Sainthill. He took no major commissions during World War II, but worked mainly as an illustrator.

He designed and completed the mosaics and stained glass for the Hall of Memory at the Australian War Memorial, Canberra, completed in 1958.  Earlier that year he remarried, to Lorna Reyburn, a New Zealand-born artist and his assistant.

Those who knew Waller described him as a modest, self-effacing man of considerable erudition which could be attributed to his love of literature. As a child he read Thomas Malory and William Morris; during the Great War he read James Macpherson and in  the 1920s he read Homer and Virgil. 

He died in 1972, in Melbourne.

External shots of his former house and studio in Melbourne are used as a backdrop to represent Dr Blake's house in the television series The Doctor Blake Mysteries.

Honours
Napier Waller was appointed an Officer (OBE) of the Order of the British Empire in 1953 and a Companion (CMG) of the Order of St Michael and St George in 1959.

Major works

 linocut The Man in Black (1926; a self-portrait, showing him with both arms intact) 
 mural for the Menzies Hotel, Melbourne (1927; the building was demolished in 1969, and the mural was sold privately)
 murals at the Melbourne Town Hall (1927)
 mural Peace After Victory, State Library of Victoria (1928)
 stained glass window, south window, Wilson Hall, Melbourne University (1928; destroyed in the Wilson Hall fire of 1952)
 mural Better Than to Squander Life’s Gifts is to Conserve Them and Ensure a Fearless Future, T&G Life Building, Collins and Russell Sts, Melbourne (1928)
 mosaic The Five Lamps of Knowledge, Great Gate, Winthrop Hall, University of Western Australia (1931)
 mosaic I’ll Put a Girdle Around the Earth, Newspaper House, Collins St, Melbourne (1933)
 murals at the Florentino Restaurant, Bourke St, Melbourne (now Grossi Restaurant) (1934); executed by four of his students under his supervision.
 stained glass window, Wesley Church, Lonsdale St, Melbourne (1935)
 stained glass window, Wilson Hall, University of Melbourne (1935; hall gutted by fire 1952, then demolished, but the window survived, and is now the Leckie Window in foyer of the Ian Potter Museum of Art)
 mural Females Through the Ages for the dining hall in the Myer Emporium, Bourke St, Melbourne (1935)
 stained glass window, Orchid Window, Botany School, University of Melbourne (1937)
 stained glass window, St Mark's Anglican Church, Camberwell (1955)
 mural Australian Symbolic Figures, Royal Insurance Co, Collins St, Melbourne (1940; the building was demolished in 1969 and the mural was donated to the Architecture School at the University of Melbourne, where it is on display in the architecture library)
 mosaics and stained glass for the Hall of Memory at the Australian War Memorial, Canberra (1958)
 three stained glass windows for The Armidale School War Memorial Assembly Hall, Armidale NSW (1960)
 mural "Pioneer Chapel Memorial", St Andrew's Church, Brighton, Melbourne (1962)
 mural The Eight Aboriginal Tribal Headmen (1963; Temple Court foyer, Collins St, Melbourne, feared lost when an arcade put through in c1990, however, during renovations of a front shop in 2003 it was rediscovered, and reported to be displayed once more, but a new wall built in front instead)
 mosaic Prometheus (1967, Monash House foyer, William St, Melbourne, recently restored)
 portrait in oils of his friend and near-neighbour Norman Macgeorge held by University of Melbourne

Notes

References
 Mural may see the light after 21 years in darkness
  
 The Man in Black
 Conservation in Action: Preserving and Cleaning the Queen's Hall Murals
 Napier Waller’s Leckie Window

Other reading
 Draffin, Nicholas, “The Art of M. Napier Waller”

Australian muralists
Artists from Victoria (Australia)
1893 births
1972 deaths
Australian Companions of the Order of St Michael and St George
Australian Officers of the Order of the British Empire
20th-century Australian painters
Australian military personnel of World War I
People from Ivanhoe, Victoria
Stained glass artists and manufacturers
Australian amputees
Military personnel from Victoria (Australia)
National Gallery of Victoria Art School alumni